Eumitra is a genus of sea snails, marine gastropod mollusks, in the family Mitridae, the miters or miter snails.

Species
Species within the genus Eumitra include:
 † Eumitra alokiza (Tenison Woods, 1879)
 Eumitra apheles Lozouet, 1991
 Eumitra caledonica Lozouet, 1991
 Eumitra imbricata Lozouet, 1991
 † Eumitra nitens (P. Marshall, 1918)
 Eumitra richeri Lozouet, 1991
 Eumitra suduirauti Bozzetti, 1997
 † Eumitra uniplica (Tate, 1889) 
 † Eumitra waitemataensis (Powell & Bartrum, 1929)

References

 Lozouet P. (1991) Mollusca Gastropoda : Eumitra récentes de la région néo-calédonienne et Charitodoron fossiles de l'Oligocène supérieur d'Aquitaine (Mitridae). In: A Crosnier & P. Bouchet (eds), Résultats des Campagnes Musorstom 7. Mémoires du Muséum National d'Histoire Naturelle, ser. A, 150: 205-222

External links
 Tate, R. (1889). The gastropods of the older Tertiary of Australia (Part II). Transactions of the Royal Society of South Australia. 11: 116-174, pls 2-10
 Finlay H.J. (1926). A further commentary on New Zealand molluscan systematics. Transactions of the New Zealand Institute. 57: 320-485, pls 18-23

 
Gastropods described in 1889